Nia Archives (born 1999) is an English record producer, DJ and songwriter, noted for her work in the jungle and drum and bass genres. In 2022, she received a MOBO Award, an NME Award, a DJ Mag Award, and a nomination for a BRIT Award.

Biography
Born in Bradford, West Yorkshire, Archives grew up in Leeds until relocating to Manchester at the age of 16, where she gained interest in the rave scene. She is half-Jamaican.

She self-released her first two extended plays (EPs), Headz Gone West (2021) and Forbidden Feelingz (2022), the latter of which received critical acclaim.

Discography

Extended plays 
 Headz Gone West (2021)
 Forbidden Feelingz (2022)
 Sunrise Bang Ur Head Against Tha Wall (2023)

Singles

Awards and nominations 

 2022 – BBC Music Introducing Award for Artist of the Year
 2022 (third) – BBC Sound of 2023
 2022 – DJ Mag Award for Best Breakthrough DJ
 2022 – MOBO Award for Best Dance/Electronic Act
 2022 – NME Award for Best Producer
 2023 (nominated) – Brit Award for Rising Star

References 

Living people
1999 births
English electronic musicians
English house musicians
English women DJs
Musicians from Bradford
English women in electronic music
English record producers
English drum and bass musicians
British women record producers
Black British DJs
21st-century English women musicians
Electronic dance music DJs